Ionian Technologies Inc. was a United States Biotechnology Company focused on molecular diagnostics development for the detection of infectious diseases and biothreat agents. It was established in 2000 in Upland, California as the first spin-off company to commercialize technology developed at the Keck Graduate Institute. Since its inception Ionian has expanded its isothermal amplification technology. Ionian was acquired in July 2010 by Alere Inc.

History
Ionian traces its origins to Dr. David Galas who was previously Chancellor, Chief Scientific Officer and Norris Professor of Applied Life Science at the Keck Graduate Institute of Applied Life Sciences. During his development of KGI he spun off Ionian Technologies from work done in his lab, based upon a 2003 PNAS paper.

In 2001, Ionian was incorporated in Delaware.

Corporate governance
Current members of the board of directors of Ionian Technologies are: David Galas and Paul Tardif.

Technology
Ionian's proprietary isothermal technology, termed the Nicking Enzyme Amplification Reaction Assay, is claimed to be capable of amplifying extremely low amounts of starting material to easily detectable levels in just a few minutes. The proprietary technology is based on the very rapid detection of small DNA or RNA fragments generated directly from the target nucleic acid. The amplification products can be detected by a variety of standard methods, including LC-MS, real-time fluorescence, lateral flow and capillary electrophoresis detection. Ionian's assay technology is therefore ideally suited for portable and handheld detectors and sensors.

Mission
Ionian Technologies Inc. describes itself as a private company focused on molecular diagnostics and advanced biomedical research tools based on proprietary isothermal systems for DNA and RNA amplification and detection. This technology is currently focused on the development of products for the medical diagnostics, agricultural (GMO), veterinary, food hygiene and biodefense markets.
Ionian has made significant efforts for providing rapid and economical systems for third world countries and have received funding from the Bill and Melinda Gates Foundation to achieve these goals.

See also
Keck Graduate Institute

External links
About Ionian Technologies
 Jobs at Ionian Technologies
Ionian's DARPA Project

Notes and references

Biotechnology companies of the United States
Companies established in 2001